Ardena Frances "Ardie" McInelly (born September 2, 1959) is an American basketball coach. McInelly was the head women's basketball coach at Idaho State from 1996 to 2001 and Air Force from 2001 to 2010.

Early life and education
McInelly was born and raised in Mackay, Idaho and graduated from Mackay High School in 1977. McInelly only began playing organized basketball as a junior in high school when her high school first formed a girls' varsity team. At Mackay High, McInelly helped the Miners girls' basketball team finish in third place in the Idaho A-4 tournament in 1977.

At Boise State University, McInelly played for the Boise State Broncos from 1977 to 1981. McInelly graduated from Boise State in 1982 with a bachelor's degree in physical education and later completed a master's degree in education from Weber State University in 1995.

Coaching career
McInelly started as a teacher and girls' basketball coach at Firth High School  in Firth, Idaho and Skyline High School in Idaho Falls, Idaho. McInelly moved up to the college level, first as an assistant coach at Montana State from 1988 to 1991, Pacific from 1991 to 1992, and Weber State from 1992 to 1996.

From 1996 to 2001, McInelly was head coach at Idaho State University, where she posted a 77-62 record. Her 2000 team went 25-5, the best season in school history. The 2000 team went 18-0 in conference play, and won the league title outright. That helped them make it to the NCAA tournament, where they were eventually eliminated by Vanderbilt. Idaho State finished third or higher in the Big Sky Conference in all five of her seasons there. She earned back-to-back coach of the year honors in the Big Sky Conference during her final two seasons.

McInelly then coached at the U.S. Air Force Academy from 2001 to 2010.  McInelly went 57–201 in nine seasons, with her best season being in 2005–06 with a 13–15 record (4–12 in Mountain West Conference games), also Air Force's most wins since moving up from Division II to Division I in the 1996–97 season. However, two starting players left the program after the season. She was fired by the Academy on March 29, 2010, with two years remaining on her contract.

In 2013, McInelly became head coach of the Harrison High School girls basketball team in Colorado Springs. McInelly retired after the 2015–16 school year and 30–40 overall record.

Head coaching record

References

1959 births
Living people
Air Force Falcons women's basketball coaches
American women's basketball coaches
American women's basketball players
Basketball coaches from Idaho
Basketball players from Idaho
Boise State Broncos women's basketball players
High school basketball coaches in the United States
Idaho State Bengals women's basketball coaches
Montana State Bobcats women's basketball coaches
People from Custer County, Idaho
Weber State University alumni
Weber State Wildcats women's basketball coaches